The 2018 Epping Forest District Council election took place on 3 May 2018 to elect members of Epping Forest District Council in England. This was on the same day as other local elections.

This is the last election in which the UK Independence Party had elected representation on the council after the defection of David Dorrell to the Conservatives, and the defeat of Rod Butler.

By-elections

Chigwell Village By-election

Lower Sheering by-election

A by-election was held on 19 October 2017 following the death of for Member of Parliament for Keighley, Gary Waller. Conservative, Paul Stalker won with 81% of the vote compared to 19% for the Liberal Democrats. Stalker completed Waller's term was re-elected in 2019 for a full term.

Ward results
Detailed below are all of the candidates nominated to stand in each ward in the upcoming election. Most figures are compared to the last time these seats were contested in any election cycle for the Epping Forest District Council election. Lower Nazeing, North Weald Bassett and Chipping Ongar, Greensted and Marden Ash are compared to the 2015 ward election held at the same time as the 2015 general election, hence the sharp decrease in turnout, both Waltham Abbey seats contested at this election have been compared to the 2014 local election result due to the fact that UKIP won both at that point:

Buckhurst Hill East

Buckhurst Hill West

Chigwell Village

Chipping Ongar, Greensted and Marden Ash

Epping Hemnall

Epping Lindsey & Thornwood Common

Grange Hill

Loughton Alderton

Loughton Broadway

Loughton Fairmead

Loughton Forest

Loughton Roding

Loughton St. John's

Loughton St. Mary's

Lower Nazeing

Moreton and Fyfield

North Weald Bassett

Theydon Bois

Waltham Abbey Honey Lane

Waltham Abbey Paternoster
Independent David Dorrell (elected as a UKIP councillor in 2014) joined the Conservatives in February 2018.

Notes

References

2018 English local elections
2018
2010s in Essex